Leonard Digges may refer to:
 Leonard Digges (scientist) (c. 1515–c. 1559), English mathematician and surveyor
 Leonard Digges (writer) (1588–1635), his grandson, Hispanist and minor poet